Omoglymmius nicobarensis is a species of beetle in the subfamily Rhysodidae. It was described by Grouvelle in 1895.

References

nicobarensis
Beetles described in 1895